James Fraser Robb (born 30 March 1935) is a Scottish retired footballer who played as a wing half and inside forward in the Scottish League for Queen's Park, Third Lanark, Stirling Albion and Stenhousemuir.

Honours 
Queen's Park
 Scottish League Second Division: 1955–56
Stirling Albion
 Scottish League Second Division: 1964–65

References

Scottish footballers
Scottish Football League players
Queen's Park F.C. players
Association football wing halves
1935 births
Footballers from Glasgow
Association football inside forwards
Strathclyde F.C. players
Third Lanark A.C. players
Stirling Albion F.C. players
Stenhousemuir F.C. players
Living people
Scotland amateur international footballers